Gay is a term that primarily refers to a homosexual person or the trait of being homosexual. The term originally meant 'carefree', 'cheerful', or 'bright and showy'.

While scant usage referring to male homosexuality dates to the late 19th century, that meaning became increasingly common by the mid-20th century. In modern English, gay has come to be used as an adjective, and as a noun, referring to the community, practices and cultures associated with homosexuality. In the 1960s, gay became the word favored by homosexual men to describe their sexual orientation. By the end of the 20th century and beginning of the 21st century, the word gay was recommended by major LGBT groups and style guides to describe people attracted to members of the same sex, although it is more commonly used to refer specifically to men. 

At about the same time, a new, pejorative use became prevalent in some parts of the world. Among younger speakers, the word has a meaning ranging from derision (e.g., equivalent to 'rubbish' or 'stupid') to a light-hearted mockery or ridicule (e.g., equivalent to 'weak', 'unmanly', or 'lame'). The extent to which these usages still retain connotations of homosexuality has been debated and harshly criticized.

History

Overview 

The word gay arrived in English during the 12th century from Old French gai, most likely deriving ultimately from a Germanic source.

In English, the word's primary meaning was "joyful", "carefree", "bright and showy", and the word was very commonly used with this meaning in speech and literature. For example, the optimistic 1890s are still often referred to as the Gay Nineties. The title of the 1938 French ballet Gaîté Parisienne ("Parisian Gaiety"), which became the 1941 Warner Brothers movie, The Gay Parisian, also illustrates this connotation. It was apparently not until the 20th century that the word began to be used to mean specifically "homosexual", although it had earlier acquired sexual connotations.

The derived abstract noun gaiety remains largely free of sexual connotations and has, in the past, been used in the names of places of entertainment, such as the Gaiety Theatre in Dublin.

Sexualization 

The word may have started to acquire associations of immorality as early as the 14th century, but had certainly acquired them by the 17th. By the late 17th century, it had acquired the specific meaning of "addicted to pleasures and dissipations", an extension of its primary meaning of "carefree" implying "uninhibited by moral constraints". A gay woman was a prostitute, a gay man a womanizer, and a gay house a brothel. An example is a letter read to a London court in 1885 during the prosecution of brothel madam and procuress Mary Jeffries that had been written by a girl while enslaved inside of a French brothel:

The use of gay to mean "homosexual" was often an extension of its application to prostitution: a gay boy was a young man or boy serving male clients.

Similarly, a gay cat was a young male apprenticed to an older hobo and commonly exchanging sex and other services for protection and tutelage. The application to homosexuality was also an extension of the word's sexualized connotation of "carefree and uninhibited", which implied a willingness to disregard conventional or respectable sexual mores. Such usage, documented as early as the 1920s, was likely present before the 20th century, although it was initially more commonly used to imply heterosexually unconstrained lifestyles, as in the once-common phrase "gay Lothario", or in the title of the book and film The Gay Falcon (1941), which concerns a womanizing detective whose first name is "Gay". Similarly, Fred Gilbert and G. H. MacDermott's music hall song of the 1880s, "Charlie Dilke Upset the Milk" – "Master Dilke upset the milk, when taking it home to Chelsea; the papers say that Charlie's gay, rather a wilful wag!" – referred to Sir Charles Dilke's alleged heterosexual impropriety. Giving testimony in court in 1889, the prostitute John Saul stated: "I occasionally do odd-jobs for different gay people."

Well into the mid 20th century a middle-aged bachelor could be described as "gay", indicating that he was unattached and therefore free, without any implication of homosexuality. This usage could apply to women too. The British comic strip Jane, first published in the 1930s, described the adventures of Jane Gay. Far from implying homosexuality, it referred to her free-wheeling lifestyle with plenty of boyfriends (while also punning on Lady Jane Grey).

A passage from Gertrude Stein's Miss Furr & Miss Skeene (1922) is possibly the first traceable published use of the word to refer to a homosexual relationship. According to Linda Wagner-Martin (Favored Strangers: Gertrude Stein and her Family, 1995) the portrait "featured the sly repetition of the word gay, used with sexual intent for one of the first times in linguistic history," and Edmund Wilson (1951, quoted by James Mellow in Charmed Circle, 1974) agreed. For example:

The word continued to be used with the dominant meaning of "carefree", as evidenced by the title of The Gay Divorcee (1934), a musical film about a heterosexual couple.

Bringing Up Baby (1938) was the first film to use the word gay in an apparent reference to homosexuality. In a scene in which Cary Grant's character's clothes have been sent to the cleaners, he is forced to wear a woman's feather-trimmed robe. When another character asks about his robe, he responds, "Because I just went gay all of a sudden!" Since this was a mainstream film at a time, when the use of the word to refer to cross-dressing (and, by extension, homosexuality) would still be unfamiliar to most film-goers, the line can also be interpreted to mean, "I just decided to do something frivolous."

In 1950, the earliest reference found to date for the word gay as a self-described name for homosexuals came from Alfred A. Gross, executive secretary for the George W. Henry Foundation, who said in the June 1950 issue of SIR magazine: "I have yet to meet a happy homosexual. They have a way of describing themselves as gay but the term is a misnomer. Those who are habitues of the bars frequented by others of the kind, are about the saddest people I’ve ever seen."

Shift to specifically homosexual 
By the mid-20th century, gay was well established in reference to hedonistic and uninhibited lifestyles and its antonym straight, which had long had connotations of seriousness, respectability, and conventionality, had now acquired specific connotations of heterosexuality. In the case of gay, other connotations of frivolousness and showiness in dress ("gay apparel") led to association with camp and effeminacy. This association no doubt helped the gradual narrowing in scope of the term towards its current dominant meaning, which was at first confined to subcultures. Gay was the preferred term since other terms, such as queer, were felt to be derogatory. Homosexual is perceived as excessively clinical, since the sexual orientation now commonly referred to as "homosexuality" was at that time a mental illness diagnosis in the Diagnostic and Statistical Manual of Mental Disorders (DSM).

In mid-20th century Britain, where male homosexuality was illegal until the Sexual Offences Act 1967, to openly identify someone as homosexual was considered very offensive and an accusation of serious criminal activity. Additionally, none of the words describing any aspect of homosexuality were considered suitable for polite society. Consequently, a number of euphemisms were used to hint at suspected homosexuality. Examples include "sporty" girls and "artistic" boys, all with the stress deliberately on the otherwise completely innocent adjective.

The 1960s marked the transition in the predominant meaning of the word gay from that of "carefree" to the current "homosexual". In the British comedy-drama film Light Up the Sky! (1960), directed by Lewis Gilbert, about the antics of a British Army searchlight squad during World War II, there is a scene in the mess hut where the character played by Benny Hill proposes an after-dinner toast. He begins, "I'd like to propose..." at which point a fellow diner interjects "Who to?", implying a proposal of marriage. The Benny Hill character responds, "Not to you for start, you ain't my type". He then adds in mock doubt, "Oh, I don't know, you're rather gay on the quiet."

By 1963, a new sense of the word gay was known well enough to be used by Albert Ellis in his book The Intelligent Woman's Guide to Man-Hunting. Similarly, Hubert Selby Jr. in his 1964 novel Last Exit to Brooklyn, could write that a character "took pride in being a homosexual by feeling intellectually and esthetically superior to those (especially women) who weren't gay...." Later examples of the original meaning of the word being used in popular culture include the theme song to the 1960–1966 animated TV series The Flintstones, wherein viewers are assured that they will "have a gay old time." Similarly, the 1966 Herman's Hermits song "No Milk Today", which became a Top 10 hit in the UK and a Top 40 hit in the U.S., included the lyric "No milk today, it was not always so; The company was gay, we'd turn night into day."

In June 1967, the headline of the review of the Beatles' Sgt. Pepper's Lonely Hearts Club Band album in the British daily newspaper The Times stated, "The Beatles revive hopes of progress in pop music with their gay new LP". The same year, The Kinks recorded "David Watts", which is about a schoolmate of Ray Davies, but is named after a homosexual concert promoter they knew, with the ambiguous line "he is so gay and fancy-free" attesting to the word's double meaning at that time. As late as 1970, the first episode of The Mary Tyler Moore Show has the demonstrably straight Mary Richards' neighbor Phyllis breezily declaiming that Mary is still "young and gay", but in an episode about two years later, Phyllis is told that her brother is "gay", which is immediately understood to mean that he is homosexual.

Homosexuality

Sexual orientation, identity, behavior 

The American Psychological Association defines sexual orientation as "an enduring pattern of emotional, romantic, and/or sexual attractions to men, women, or both sexes," ranging "along a continuum, from exclusive attraction to the other sex to exclusive attraction to the same sex." Sexual orientation can also be "discussed in terms of three categories: heterosexual (having emotional, romantic, or sexual attractions to members of the other sex), gay/lesbian (having emotional, romantic, or sexual attractions to members of one's own sex), and bisexual (having emotional, romantic, or sexual attractions to both men and women)."

According to Rosario, Schrimshaw, Hunter, Braun (2006), "the development of a lesbian, gay, or bisexual (LGB) sexual identity is a complex and often difficult process. Unlike members of other minority groups (e.g., ethnic and racial minorities), most LGB individuals are not raised in a community of similar others from whom they learn about their identity and who reinforce and support that identity. Rather, LGB individuals are often raised in communities that are either ignorant of or openly hostile toward homosexuality."

The British gay rights activist Peter Tatchell has argued that the term gay is merely a cultural expression which reflects the current status of homosexuality within a given society, and claiming that "Queer, gay, homosexual ... in the long view, they are all just temporary identities. One day, we will not need them at all."

If a person engages in sexual activity with a partner of the same sex but does not self-identify as gay, terms such as 'closeted', 'discreet', or 'bi-curious' may apply. Conversely, a person may identify as gay without having had sex with a same-sex partner. Possible choices include identifying as gay socially, while choosing to be celibate, or while anticipating a first homosexual experience. Further, a bisexual person might also identify as "gay" but others may consider gay and bisexual to be mutually exclusive. There are some who are drawn to the same sex but neither engage in sexual activity nor identify as gay; these could have the term asexual applied, even though asexual generally can mean no attraction, or involve heterosexual attraction but no sexual activity.

Terminology 

Some reject the term homosexual as an identity-label because they find it too clinical-sounding; they believe it is too focused on physical acts rather than romance or attraction, or too reminiscent of the era when homosexuality was considered a mental illness. Conversely, some reject the term gay as an identity-label because they perceive the cultural connotations to be undesirable or because of the negative connotations of the slang usage of the word.

Style guides, like the following from the Associated Press, call for gay over homosexual:

There are those who reject the gay label for reasons other than shame or negative connotations. Writer Alan Bennett and fashion icon André Leon Talley are out and open gay men who reject being labeled gay, believing the gay label confines them.

Gay community vs. LGBT community

Starting in the mid-1980s in the United States, a conscious effort was underway within what was then commonly called the gay community, to add the term lesbian to the name of organizations that involved both male and female homosexuals, and to use the terminology of gay and lesbian, lesbian/gay, or a similar phrase when referring to that community. Accordingly, organizations such as the National Gay Task Force became the National Gay and Lesbian Task Force. For many feminist lesbians, it was also important that lesbian be named first, to avoid the implication that women were secondary to men, or an afterthought. In the 1990s, this was followed by a similar effort to include terminology specifically including bisexual, transgender, intersex, and other people, reflecting the intra-community debate about the inclusion of these other sexual minorities as part of the same movement. Consequently, the portmanteau les/bi/gay has sometimes been used, and initialisms such as LGBT, LGBTQ, LGBTQI, and others have come into common use by such organizations, and most news organizations have formally adopted some such variation.

Descriptor 

The term gay can also be used as an adjective to describe things related to homosexual men, or things which are part of the said culture. For example, the term "gay bar" describes the bar which either caters primarily to a homosexual male clientele or is otherwise part of homosexual male culture.

Using it to describe an object, such as an item of clothing, suggests that it is particularly flamboyant, often on the verge of being gaudy and garish. This usage predates the association of the term with homosexuality but has acquired different connotations since the modern usage developed.

Use as a noun 
The label gay was originally used purely as an adjective ("he is a gay man" or "he is gay"). The term has also been in use as a noun with the meaning "homosexual man" since the 1970s, most commonly in the plural for an unspecified group, as in "gays are opposed to that policy." This usage is somewhat common in the names of organizations such as Parents, Families and Friends of Lesbians and Gays (PFLAG) and Children of Lesbians And Gays Everywhere (COLAGE). It is sometimes used to refer to individuals, as in "he is a gay" or "two gays were there too," although this may be perceived as derogatory. It was also used for comedic effect by the Little Britain character Dafydd Thomas.

Generalized pejorative use

When used with a derisive attitude (e.g., "that was so gay"), the word gay is pejorative. Though retaining other meanings, its use among young people as a term of disparagement is common with 97 percent of American LGBTQ middle and high school students reporting hearing its negative use in 2021. This pejorative usage has its origins in the late 1970s, with the word gaining a pejorative sense by association with the previous meaning: homosexuality was seen as inferior or undesirable. Beginning in the 1980s, and especially in the late 1990s, the usage as a generic insult became common among young people.

This usage of the word has been criticized as homophobic. A 2006 BBC ruling by the Board of Governors over the use of the word in this context by Chris Moyles on his Radio 1 show, "I do not want that one, it's gay," advises "caution on its use" for this reason:

The BBC's ruling was heavily criticized by the Minister for Children, Kevin Brennan, who stated in response that "the casual use of homophobic language by mainstream radio DJs" is:

Shortly after the Moyles incident, a campaign against homophobia was launched in Britain under the slogan "homophobia is gay", playing on the double meaning of the word "gay" in youth culture, as well as the popular perception that vocal homophobia is common among closeted homosexuals.

In a 2013 article published in the Journal of Interpersonal Violence, University of Michigan researchers Michael Woodford, Alex Kulick and Perry Silverschanz, alongside Appalachian State University professor Michael L. Howell, argued that the pejorative use of the word "gay" was a microaggression. Their research found that college-age men were more likely to repeat the word pejoratively if their friends said it, while they were less likely to say it if they had lesbian, gay or bisexual peers.

Parallels in other languages
 The concept of a "gay identity" and the use of the term gay may not be used or understood the same way in non-Westernised cultures, since modes of sexuality may differ from those prevalent in the West. For example, the term "two spirit" is not interchangeable with "LGBT Native American" or "gay Indian". This term differs from most western, mainstream definitions of sexuality and gender identity in that it is not a self-chosen term of personal sexual or gender "identity"; rather, it is a sacred, spiritual and ceremonial role that is recognized and confirmed by the Elders of the two spirit's ceremonial community.
 The German equivalent for "gay", "schwul", which is etymologically derived from "schwül" (hot, humid), also acquired the pejorative meaning within youth culture.

See also 

 Anti-LGBT slogans
 Deviance (sociology)
 Gay bashing
 Gay gene (Xq28)
 Gay men
 Gay sexual practices
 Gender identity
 Hate speech
 Heteronormativity
 Heterosexism
 Human female sexuality
 Human male sexuality
 Human Rights Campaign
 Labeling theory
 Lesbian sexual practices
 LGBT rights opposition
 LGBT themes in mythology
 List of gay, lesbian or bisexual people
 List of LGBT events
 National Gay and Lesbian Task Force
 Religion and sexuality
 Sexuality and gender identity-based cultures
 Social stigma
 Tu'er Shen
 Men who have sex with men

References

Further reading

External links

1920s neologisms
LGBT terminology
Same-sex sexuality
Homosexuality
LGBT-related slurs
English words